Cellular and Molecular Neurobiology is a peer-reviewed scientific journal covering neuroscience, especially at the cellular and subcellular levels. It was established in 1981 and is published by  Springer Science+Business Media. The editor-in-chief is Juan M. Saavedra (Georgetown University).

Abstracting and indexing
The journal is abstracted and indexed in:

According to the Journal Citation Reports, the journal has a 2017 impact factor of 3.895.

References

External links

Neuroscience journals
Publications established in 1981